is a passenger railway station located in Hodogaya-ku, Yokohama, Japan, operated by the private railway operator Sagami Railway (Sotetsu).

Lines 
Wadamachi Station is served by the Sagami Railway Main Line, and lies 4.3 kilometers from the starting point of the line at Yokohama Station.

Station layout
The station consists of two opposed side platforms serving two tracks.

Platforms

Adjacent stations

History
Wadamachi Stationed opened on August 15, 1952.

Passenger statistics
In fiscal 2019, the station was used by an average of 18,017 passengers daily.

The passenger figures for previous years are as shown below.

Surrounding area
 Wadacho Shopping Street
 Yokohama National University Tokiwadai Campus
Tokiwa Park
Kanagawa Prefectural Hodogaya Park

Bus services

Wadamachi Sta. South Ent. Bus Stop
Yokohama Municipal Bus (Shiei), Sagami Railway (Sotetsu)

See also
 List of railway stations in Japan

References

External links 

  Official home page  

Railway stations in Kanagawa Prefecture
Railway stations in Japan opened in 1952
Railway stations in Yokohama